Dino Wieser (born June 13, 1989) is a Swiss professional ice hockey forward who is currently playing for and is an alternate captain of HC Davos in the National League (NL).

Playing career
On March 18, 2013, Wieser was signed to a three-year contract extension by Davos. On October 20, 2015, Wieser agreed to a three-year contract extension with HC Davos for a reported worth of CHF 1.8 million.

On December 28, 2018, Wieser agreed to an early four-year contract extension with HC Davos through the 2022-23 season.

International play
Wieser was selected to play for the Swiss national team to participate in the 2015 IIHF World Championship.

Personal
His brother Marc Wieser is also a professional hockey player.

Career statistics

Regular season and playoffs

International

References

External links

1989 births
Living people
HC Davos players
Swiss ice hockey forwards
People from Davos
Sportspeople from Graubünden